Robert L. Clark was a member of the Wisconsin State Assembly.

Biography
Clark was born on January 31, 1872, in St. Joseph, Missouri. He attended Whitewater Normal School.

Career
Clark was elected to the Assembly in 1910. He was a  Republican.

References

Politicians from St. Joseph, Missouri
Republican Party members of the Wisconsin State Assembly
Wisconsin lawyers
Schoolteachers from Wisconsin
University of Wisconsin–Whitewater alumni
1872 births
Year of death missing
Educators from Missouri